Cuddalore Junction (Code: CUPJ), is a junction station serving the City of Cuddalore. The station is a part of the Trichy division of the Southern Railway zone and its official code is CUPJ. Its old name is Cuddalore Junction and the station code then was COT.

Location and layout
The Junction falls on the Chennai Egmore–Thanjavur main line. Three railway lines diverge from  here.

The Junction has four platforms & one stabling line, which is more used for handling freight trains. Parcel movement to/from Cuddalore Port Jn. is quite high. Cuddalore Port Junction also witnesses good amount of originating/terminating freight traffic. The junction also has facilities for handling container cargo.

Importance
Cuddalore Port Junction was one of the 9 scheduled halts in Southern Railway for the Science Express (Science Exhibition on Wheels), Phase VI, focusing on Bio-diversity.

References

External links

 Southern Railways - Official Website
 

Trichy railway division
Railway stations in Cuddalore district
Railway junction stations in Tamil Nadu
Cuddalore
Year of establishment missing